Ilyocyprididae is a family of ostracods belonging to the order Podocopida.

Genera:
 Ilyocyprella
 Jeiocypris
 Jliocypris
 Juxilyocypris Kempf, 2011
 Neuquenocypris Musacchio, 1973
 Renicypris Ye, 2002

References

Ostracods